Reinl is a German language surname. Notable people with the name include:
 Harald Reinl (1908–1986), Austrian film director
 Jessica Reinl (2001), Irish singer and songwriter

References 

German-language surnames
Surnames from given names